East Tuddenham is a village in the English county of Norfolk.

History
East Tuddenham's name is of Anglo-Saxon origin and derives from the Old English for 'Tuda's' homestead or village.

There is evidence to suggest that East Tuddenham was the site of a Roman settlement, with Roman coins, pottery and the remains of a building with a hypocaust.

East Tuddenham is listed in the Domesday Book as a settlement of 32 households in the hundred of Mitford. In 1086, the village was divided between the estates of Alan of Brittany, Hermer de Ferrers, Ralph de Beaufour and William de Warenne.

During the First World War, RAF Mattishall was used as a night-landing airfield for aircraft of No. 51 Squadron RAF, flying interception missions against German Zeppelins.

Geography

East Tuddenham falls within the constituency of Mid Norfolk and is represented at Parliament by George Freeman MP of the Conservative Party. For the purposes of Local Government, East Tuddenham is in Breckland.

All Saints' Church
All Saints' Churchtower dates from the Thirteenth Century whilst the nave and chancel date from the Fifteenth Century and are constructed in the Perpendicular style. All Saints' font also dates from the Twelfth Century and features carved vines and foliage around it. All Saints' possesses good examples of Twentieth Century stained glass, particularly depictions of Faith, Hope and Charity by Leonard Walker.

Notable Residents
 Sir George Mellish (1814-1877)- English barrister and judge

References

External links

Breckland District
Villages in Norfolk
Civil parishes in Norfolk